North Cape is a cape on the northern coast of the island of Magerøya in Northern Norway. The cape is in Nordkapp Municipality in Troms og Finnmark county, Norway. The European route E69 motorway (highway) has its northern terminus at North Cape, which makes it the northernmost point in Europe that can be accessed by car and makes the E69 the northernmost public road in Europe. The plateau is a popular tourist attraction. North Cape Hall, a visitor centre, was built in 1988 on the plateau. It includes a café, restaurant, post office, souvenir shop, a small museum, and video cinema.

Geography

Nordkapp is often inaccurately referred to as the northernmost point of Europe. However, the neighbouring Knivskjellodden Cape actually extends  further north. Furthermore, both of these points are situated on an island (Magerøya), albeit one connected by road to the mainland. That point is located near the village of Mehamn on the Nordkinn Peninsula. The northernmost point of Europe including islands, is hundreds of kilometers further north, either in Russia's Franz Josef Land or Norway's Svalbard archipelago, depending on whether Franz Josef Land is considered to be in Europe or in Asia.

The North Cape is the point where the Norwegian Sea, part of the Atlantic Ocean meets the Barents Sea, part of the Arctic Ocean. The midnight sun can be seen from 14 May to 31 July. The sun reaches its lowest point between 12:14 am and 12:24 am (00:14 and 00:24) during those days.

Transport
The North Cape is reached by European route E69 highway through the North Cape Tunnel, an undersea tunnel connecting the island of Magerøya to the mainland. The EuroVelo bicycle routes EV1, EV7 and EV11 connect the North Cape to Sagres, Portugal, Malta and Athens, respectively.

Several cruise ships visit North Cape every year. Honningsvåg is one of the main stops of the Hurtigruten coastal ships.

Regular buses run from the nearby town of Honningsvåg to the North Cape, and coaches meet the many cruise ships that call at the port of Honningsvåg.

The nearest airport is Honningsvåg Airport (HVG), which offers several flights to and from Tromsø Langnes International Airport (TOS).

Road distance to North Cape from different towns with airports:
Honningsvåg; 
Lakselv; 
Hammerfest; 
Alta; 
Kirkenes; 
Tromsø;

Winter
It is possible to visit North Cape during winter, but there is often heavy snow and wind and the last stretch of road is only open for convoys at certain times. The road to North Cape is kept open during winter and is accessible to regular vehicles and drivers who can cope with the snow and wind conditions that may occur in winter. Before this, E69 was the only winter-closed E-route in Europe.

History
The North Cape was named by the Englishman Steven Borough, captain of the Edward Bonaventure, which sailed past in 1553 in search of the Northeast Passage.

Early tourism
The North Cape became a popular tourist destination during the last decades of the nineteenth century, especially after King Oscar II's visit in 1873. Regular coastal steamer routes from Germany to Northern Norway established in this period facilitated these visits, and Thomas Cook & Son began arranging tours to the destination as early as 1875. Tourists who climbed the cape would often do so using a path equipped with wired ropes from Hornviken. They would often celebrate the visit with the writing of postcards, so-called "Cape cards", gazing at the midnight sun.

Monuments and buildings
A granite column was erected commemorating the visit of King Oscar II of Norway and Sweden in 1873 and the visit of German Kaiser Wilhelm II (in 1891) was also marked with a memorial. In 1891–92, an octagonal wooden building was erected on top of the cape, later named "Stoppenbrinck's" (or "Stoppenbrink's") "Champagne Pavilion".

World War II

In 1943, the Battle of the North Cape was fought in the Arctic Ocean off this cape, where the German battleship Scharnhorst was eventually sunk by gunfire from the British battleship HMS Duke of York and torpedoes from the Norwegian destroyer HNoMS Stord, and other ships of the British Navy.

Road access
A road to the North Cape was first built in 1956.

Admission fee courtcase
As of Q3 2022, the justice system has decided that money will not be charged for parking [on the parking lot] at North Cape; the government has won the case in the appellate court also; the defendant has appealed to the supreme court, as of Q3 2022. (The courtcase started in 2021.)

Often there is fog (since the plateau is above the common cloud base), which obscures the view. There is no discount for this situation, but the full price ticket is valid for multiple entries within 24 hours.

In 2000, and again in 2011, the Norwegian Ministry of the Environment responded to pressure from interest groups and asked Nordkapps VEL, the company that maintains the site, to reduce the admission fee to the plateau. Nordkapps VEL responded that the 8,000 daily visitors and distant location places great demands on the operations, maintenance, and security of the facilities and natural features of the large site. Visitors arriving by foot, bicycle, or other non-motorized vehicles are nowadays offered free entrance.

Sport and leisure
The 2009 Trans Europe Foot Race started in Bari, Italy and finished at North Cape.

The NorthCape4000 is a bicycle race that finishes at the North Cape.

The first stage of the 2014 Arctic Race of Norway was held on North Cape on 14 August 2014.

The record of cycling from the northern to the southern end of Norway, North Cape to Lindesnes, is 4 days, 22 hours and 18 minutes, performed by a group of five men from Rye in Oslo, in July 2003.

In popular culture
Footage from the North Cape is featured frequently in films and television, most notably in the 2014 action comedy film Børning, which revolves around an illegal street race from south of Oslo to the North Cape.

Gallery

References

External links

 North Cape Museum official website
 Tourist information
 Pictures from Skarsvåg and North Cape
 Jan S. Krogh's Geosite: North Cape

Extreme points of Earth
Headlands of Norway
Landforms of Troms og Finnmark
Magerøya
Nordkapp
Tourist attractions in Troms og Finnmark